Lover of the Great Bear (also known as The Smugglers) is a 1971 Italian-French-German drama film directed by Valentino Orsini and starring Giuliano Gemma and Senta Berger. It is loosely based on the Polish novel Kochanek Wielkiej Niedźwiedzicy by Sergiusz Piasecki.

Plot

Cast 
 
Giuliano Gemma as Vladek
Senta Berger as Fela
Bruno Cremer as Saska 
Francesca Romana Coluzzi as  Berna
Spiros Focás as  Alfred 
Nicoletta Machiavelli as Leonia 
Flavio Bucci  
 Peter Capell 		
Alessandro Haber as  Topo 
 Antonio Piovanelli  as Ivan 
Sybil Danning
Nazzareno Zamperla as Smuggler (uncredited)

References

External links

1971 crime drama films
1971 films
Italian crime drama films
French crime drama films
West German films
Films directed by Valentino Orsini
Films based on Polish novels
Films set in Poland
Films set in the 1920s
Films scored by Benedetto Ghiglia
1970s French films
1970s Italian films